Quakerism in Sichuan refers to the history and implantation of Quakerism (Religious Society of Friends) in the Chinese province of Sichuan (formerly romanized as Szechwan, Szechuan or Sz-chwan; also referred to as "West China").

History 

In 1882, an article titled "Shall the Gospel be preached to this generation of the Chinese?" by Dr. George King was published in London. Several members of the Society of Friends reading it, were impressed with the fact that the Society had no representatives engaged in missionary effort in China. Three years later (1885), two Irish Friends, Robert John Davidson and his wife Mary Jane Davidson, were appointed by the Friends' Foreign Mission Association (FFMA, belonging to the Britain Yearly Meeting) as missionaries to work in China. They left England in September, 1886, and reached Sichuan the following year. At a local medical assistant Mr. Sie's suggestion, the Davidsons paid their first visit to Tungchwan in the end of 1887.

In 1889, after a series of problems regarding their long-term settlement with the local authorities of Tungchwan, they were told that they had "no right to be there". R. J. Davidson had no choice but to turn to Chungking, the only place which seemed open to him. There a small house was rented until the following spring, when the large premises in the White Dragon Fountain Street became the first home of the Mission. Opening services were held in March 1890, and a dispensary was opened soon after. Frederic S. Deane joined the Mission and established a boys' school at the Great Ridge Street in 1892. That winter four more missionaries were added to the band. Leonard Wigham joined Deane at the young men's house, while Alice M. Beck and Margaret Southall went to another mission house; and Caroline N. Southall had already started a girls' school on those premises. In 1893, Mira L. Cumber and Isaac Mason joined the mission. A meeting house was opened in March 1894.

In May 1894, R. J. Davidson and Mason travelled to Yangtaochi in Tungchwan. They rented part of an inn for dispensing medicine. In the autumn of 1894, Mason returned alone to Yangtaochi. He spent several weeks there, living at an inn, dispensing medicine and preaching daily. He had gathered a few people during this period, and with them he held many meetings in dirty little rooms at the inns where he stayed. These visits subsequently extended to the cities of Taihochen and Sehunghsien, which had been developed into an important branch of the Tungchwan work later known as the Mission's Northern District.

In 1895, a serious outbreak of anti-foreign agitation spread throughout the province. Open-air preaching had been considered dangerous for long periods at a time, and dispensary patients decreased by half the number. The missionaries lived for weeks together in constant fear of an outbreak. In 1897, the FFMA purchased an estate on the hills south of Chungking and turned it into a school for missionaries' children, which was opened in March, 1898.

In 1899, A. Warburton Davidson went to reside at Sehunghsien. He was pursued and severely beaten by a crowd after selling books in a temple yard at one of the neighbouring markets named Yu Lung Chen. In consequence of his injuries he was taken to Chungking for rest. That same year Mason and his party were appointed to live at Tungchwan, they took up residence early in 1900. They opened a dispensary and held meetings for worship in a very dilapidated chapel made out of unused small rooms. In 1902, Mira L. Cumber and Dr. Lucy E. Harris joined the Tungchwan mission, the latter being FFMA's first qualified medical missionary in China. The Tungchwan Boys' School was opened before the missionaries taking up residence in that prefecture. The Girls' School was commenced in 1902 by Cumber. It had only eight students the first year, but there were thirty the following year, and by 1905 the number had doubled.

During this period, two new mission centres were opened in Chentu, the capital, and Sui-ling Hsien, a county situated between Tungchwan and Chungking. The former was opened by Robert J. and Mary J. Davidson, the work was joined by Dr. Henry T. and Elizabeth J. Hodgkin in 1905. Isaac and Esther L. Mason moved to Sui-ling, work at Tungchwan had been taken up by Edward B. and Margaret Vardon.

The Szechwan Yearly Meeting founded in 1904 with 56 local converts, was constituted of five Monthly Meetings: Chungking, Tungchwan, Chentu, Sui-ling and Tungliang. By the end of 1921, the English Friends had 429 church members; and by 1937, 460 members. Although they made few converts, their work had a considerable impact. Chungking Friends School thrived, and the International Friends Institute opened in 1909, became a place where people could meet freely in a peaceful setting. Isaac Mason made the first Chinese translations of Quaker writings. The FFMA was also one of the four mission societies responsible for the creation of West China Union University in 1910, together with American Baptist Foreign Mission Society (American Baptist Churches USA), American Methodist Episcopal Mission (Methodist Episcopal Church), and Canadian Methodist Mission (Methodist Church of Canada). The university's buildings were designed by the English Quaker architect Frederick Rowntree.

In 1930, Clifford Morgan Stubbs, a New Zealand Quaker missionary and Professor of Chemistry at the West China Union University, was stabbed to death by communists.

Tungchwan Monthly Meeting 

The Tungchwan Monthly Meeting (later known as Santai Monthly Meeting) established by Isaac Mason in 1900, was the largest mission branch of Friends' Foreign Mission Association's Northern District, governing four towns under the administration of Tungchwan Prefecture (Jingfu), and member churches of nine counties in other administrative regions (including Yenting, Sehunghsien and its seat Taihochen). Most of these member churches were closed in the 1940s. According to the statistics provided by Tungchwan Government in 1944, there were 278 local converts consisting of 195 men and 83 women. By the time of the communists' takeover of Sichuan in late 1949, only the three congregations in Tungchwan city centre, Lingxing and Jingfu were still active. The Jingfu meeting house was closed in the early 1950s after the expulsion of foreign missionaries. All church activities had ceased by 1956. By the end of 1986, there were more than 1,200 officially registered Protestants in Santai County (formerly, Tungchwan). In 1987, more than 1,000 people gathered for Christmas service in Lingxing.

Current situation 

After the communist takeover of China in 1949, Protestant Churches in China were also forced to sever their ties with respective overseas Churches, which has thus led to the merging of all the denominations into communist-sanctioned Three-Self Patriotic Church.

Gallery

See also 

 Christianity in Sichuan
 Catholic Church in Sichuan
 Protestantism in Sichuan
 Anglicanism in Sichuan
 Methodism in Sichuan
 Baptist Christianity in Sichuan
 Seventh-day Adventist Church in Sichuan
 Yearly Meeting
 Anti-Christian Movement (China)
 Anti-missionary riots in China
 Denunciation Movement
 House church (China)

References

Bibliography

External links 
 

 
Sichuan
History of Christianity in Sichuan